"Fly Away" is a song by American singer Lenny Kravitz. It was released as the fourth single from his fifth studio album, 5 (1998). Released on November 9, 1998, "Fly Away" peaked at number 12 on the US Billboard Hot 100. Outside of the United States, "Fly Away" topped the charts in Iceland and the United Kingdom and peaked within the top ten of the charts in several countries, including Australia, Canada, New Zealand, and the Republic of Ireland. The song won a Grammy Award for Best Male Rock Performance in 1999.

Background
"Fly Away" emerged from Kravitz testing an amp that was brought to the studio. After plugging in the available guitar, Kravitz started playing the song, stating, "I was listening to the way different chords were ringing, just moving between A, C, G and D, and the next thing I knew I was telling the engineer to hook up the mics and record."

By the time he wrote "Fly Away", Kravitz had already turned in the completed album to Virgin Records, and he considered releasing the song as a b-side. However, after playing the song for a friend, they responded, "If you don’t put it on the album, I’m gonna be so pissed off at you." After Kravitz contacted his label about the inclusion of the song, they were reluctant, but he sent them the song anyway. Upon hearing the track, they added it to the album.

Critical reception
Birmingham Evening Mail commented, "If you watch TV you'll already be familiar with this - it's the song from the Peugeot TV ad which seems to have rarely been off the screen during the past few weeks. It's about time Kravitz returned to the big time - remember when he sold out the NEC in `91? - and this could see him back in the chart big time."

Chart performance
"Fly Away" reached number 12 on the Billboard Hot 100 and topped both the Mainstream Rock and Modern Rock Tracks charts. On Canada's RPM Top Singles chart, "Fly Away" reached number three and stayed in the top 20 for six weeks. Outside North America, the song reached number one in Iceland and on the UK Singles Chart; its success in the UK is attributed to its appearance in a television advertisement for the Peugeot 206 Supermini car. In Australia and New Zealand, "Fly Away" peaked at number eight and was certified Gold in both countries. The song helped to expand the success of his fifth studio album, 5, in Europe and earned Kravitz a Grammy Award in 1999 for Best Male Rock Performance, his first of four consecutive wins in this category.

Music video
The music video for the single was directed by American director Paul Hunter. It features Kravitz and his band playing in a club, surrounded by a crowd dancing to the song, with some of them having fun and others making out. Special effects were added to the video to make it look beat up and grainy. A girl in the crowd is briefly shown topless several times during the video. The video is featured on the DVD for Kravitz's Greatest Hits album tour edition.

Kravitz also appears in a 2010 video in which he joined the Voice of Praise Choir from the First Baptist Church of Lewisville, Texas, as they performed "Fly Away" on a street in New Orleans.

Track listings

US promo CD
 "Fly Away" (LP version) – 3:41
 Call out hook – 0:10

International CD and cassette single
 "Fly Away" – 3:41
 "Fly Away" (live acoustic) – 4:03
 "Believe" (live acoustic) – 5:14

European CD single
 "Fly Away"
 "Believe" (live acoustic)

French CD single
 "Fly Away" – 3:41
 "Fly Away" (live acoustic) – 4:03

Charts and certifications

Weekly charts

Year-end charts

Certifications

Release history

In popular culture

"Fly Away" was featured in the film Coyote Ugly and is the theme song for the Canadian reality television series Ice Pilots NWT.

In 2018, it is used in the Comic Con Trailer for Star Trek: Discovery Season 2.

After the 1999 NBA Finals, NBC used "Fly Away" for their montage.

This song was used in a Renault Duster advertisement and several Nissan commercials.

Internet personality Neil Cicierega made a lyric video of the song with the vocal tracks heavily altered, which received coverage from several websites.

The song has been used in a tourism campaign for The Bahamas, featuring Kravitz who is of Bahamian descent.

References

1998 singles
1998 songs
Grammy Award for Best Male Rock Vocal Performance
Lenny Kravitz songs
Music videos directed by Paul Hunter (director)
Number-one singles in Iceland
Song recordings produced by Lenny Kravitz
Songs written by Lenny Kravitz
UK Singles Chart number-one singles